The McCoy Center is an office building located in Columbus, Ohio. The building was acquired by JPMorgan Chase & Co. with its 2004 merger with Bank One Corporation. Formally known as the Corporate Center Columbus (or more often and colloquially "Polaris"), the building was renamed after the merger to honor the McCoy family, who led the Columbus-based Bank One for three generations.  Inside is a gift shop, Starbucks, shipping center, car rental, nurse's station, health & wellness center, two cafeterias, a bistro, five Chase automated teller machines, and a personal banker. The building is located off Polaris Parkway, home of the Polaris Fashion Place mall.

The facility—¼ mile from end to end—houses approximately 13,000 employees in a space equal in square footage to the Empire State Building.  At , it is the largest JPMorgan Chase & Co. facility in the world, the largest office building in the Columbus, Ohio area, and the second largest single-tenant office building in the United States behind The Pentagon, from which the McCoy Center has borrowed its way-finding system.  Only a handful of office buildings in the U.S. - the 5.7 million-square-foot Warren G. Magnuson Health Sciences Building in Seattle and the 4.4 million-square-foot McDermott Building in San Antonio among them - are bigger.

Starting in 2017, Chase began a $200 million renovation of the facility

References

External links 
Chase Polaris on Wikimapia

JPMorgan Chase buildings
Office buildings in Columbus, Ohio
Office buildings completed in 1996